The Jannayak Janta Party, abbreviated as, JJP is an Indian state-level political party in Haryana, India. JJP is a recognized state political party. JJP was founded on 9 December 2018 by Dushyant Chautala with the ideology of Devi Lal, who served as Deputy Prime Minister of India. Based on the ideology of Jat solidarity and socialism, JJP is very strong and popular in some parts of Haryana.

Formation 
JJP emerged from a split in the Indian National Lok Dal (INLD) which itself had been cause by infighting among the Chautala family. An INLD rally at Gohana in October 2018 had seen heckling of Abhay Chautala, a son of INLD leader Om Prakash Chautala for which Dushyant Chautala, a grandson, and his younger brother, Digvijay Chautala, were blamed.

When Dushyant and Digvijay were expelled from the INLD for allegedly permitting indiscipline at the rally, their father, Ajay Chautala, supported them and so he, too, was expelled from the INLD.

The JJP was formally launched at a rally in Jind in December 2018 by Dushyant Chautala who held a seat in the Lok Sabha of the national Parliament of India, from when he was an INLD member.

He said that the party's name was in honour of Devi Lal, a former Deputy Prime Minister of India whose supporters in Haryana refer to him as Jan Nayak, and that the party intended to follow his principles.

Dushyant's father, Ajay, absent from the Jind rally, being at that time in jail in relation to an alleged scam, as also was Om Prakash Chautala. Despite now being in opposite political factions, and claiming that the JJP was standing for values which the INLD had abandoned, Dushyant nonetheless asked supporters at the rally to chant "Long Live OP Chautala".

Abhay Chautala who was leading the INLD in the absence of Om Prakash Chautala reacted to the news by saying that "Everybody is not capable of floating a political party and then continue with it". At least three INLD MLAs, including Dushyant's mother, Naina Singh Chautala were early members of the new JJP.

JJP in their debut 2019 Haryana Legislative Assembly election won 10 seats and the party President Dushyant Chautala was appointed as the Deputy Chief Minister of Haryana on 25 October 2019

Symbolism 

The JJP has proposed a flag that is primarily green in colour, with a quarter in light yellow. Key is election symbol. JJP said the colours symbolise- Green was also adopted as a symbolic colour by Devi Lal, whose picture appears in the flag and Yellow symbolically represents 'Yuva Urja'.

List of Members of Legislative Assembly in Haryana

State Minister

Haryana

See also
 Devi Lal
 Dynastic politics of Haryana
 Dushyant Chautala

References

 
Political parties in India
State political parties in Haryana
 
Janata Parivar
Political parties established in 2018
2018 establishments in Haryana